Praying towns were settlements established by English colonial governments in New England from 1646 to 1675 in an effort to convert local Native Americans to Christianity. 

The Native people who moved into these towns were known as Praying Indians. Before 1674 the villages were the most ambitious experiment in converting Native Americans to Christianity in the Thirteen Colonies, and led to the creation of the first books in an Algonquian language, including the first bible printed in British North America. During King Philip's War from 1675 to 1678, many praying towns were depopulated, in part due to forced internment of praying Indians on Deer Island, many of whom died during the winter of 1675. After the war, many of the originally allotted praying towns were never reestablished, however some praying towns persisted. Living descendants in New England trace their ancestry to residents of praying towns.

History 

John Eliot was an English colonist and Puritan minister who played an important role in the establishment of praying towns. In the 1630s and 1640s, Eliot worked with bilingual indigenous Algonquians including John Sassamon, an orphan of the Smallpox pandemic of 1633, and Cockenoe, an enslaved Montauk prisoner of the Pequot War, to translate several Christian works, eventually including the Bible, into Massachusett. Having learned enough Massachusett to preach, Eliot began evangelism with the Neponset band of Massachusetts, but was first well received when preaching at in 1646 at Nonantum in present day Newton, meaning "place of rejoicing" in Massachusett. This sermon led to a friendship with Waban (Nipmuc, –), who became the first Native American in Massachusetts to convert to Christianity.

News of Eliot's evangelism reached England, and in 1649, Cromwell's Parliament passed an Act creating the Society for the Propagation of the Gospel in New England, which would fund the establishment of an Indian College at Harvard and a press in Cambridge for printing Eliot's Christian commentaries in Massachusett. 

Between 1651 and 1675, the General Court of the Massachusetts Bay Colony had established 14 praying towns. The first two praying towns of Natick (est. 1651) and Ponkapoag (est. 1654), were primarily populated by Massachusett people. Wamesit was established for the Pawtucket, who were part of the Pennacook confederacy. The other praying towns were established as Nipmuc outposts including Wabquasset, Quinnetusset, and Maanexit. Quaboag, far from the other settlements, was never established due to the outbreak of King Philip's War.

List of Praying Towns

Massachusetts Bay Colony 

 Natick
 Ponkapoag
 Hassanamessit
 Chaubunakongkomun (Chaubunagungamaug)
 Manexit
 Manchaug
 Magunkaquog
 Nashoba
 Okommakamesitt
 Pakachoag
 Quaboag
 Quinnetusset
 Waushakum
 Wabaquasset
 Waentug
 Wamesit

Plymouth Colony 

The Plymouth, Connecticut, and Rhode Island Colonies also established praying towns. The following list is adapted from a 1674 list by Puritan pastor Daniel Gookin. 

 Meeshawn
 Potanumaquut
 Manamoyik
 Sawkattuket
 Nobsquassit
 Matakees
 Weequakut
 Satuit
 Pawpoesit
 Mashpee
 Wakoquet
 Codtaninut
 Ashimuit
 Weesquobs
 Pispogutt
 Wawayontat
 Sokones
 Cotuhkikut
 Namasket

Other praying towns included Gay Head, Nantucket, Herring Pond (Plymouth) and Nukkehkummees (Dartmouth).

Connecticut

Three praying towns were established in Connecticut: Maanexit (a Nipmuc word meaning "where we gather") is believed to have been located at the site of present-day Fabyan (Thompson, Connecticut). Quinnatisset (meaning "little long river") was located six miles south of Maanexit, and Wabaquasset (meaning "mats for covering the house") was taken over by the development of present-day Woodstock, Connecticut. These three towns held between 100 and 150 Nipmuc tribal members.

Purpose 

The Puritan missionaries goal in creating praying towns was to convert Native Americans to Christianity and also adopt European customs and farming techniques. They were expected to give up own cultural lifeways, attire, religion, and anything else that the colonists considered "uncivilized." The Massachusetts General Court recognized the work of Eliot and helped to establish additional praying towns.

Comparison to Jesuits in Canada 

The idea of a full conversion was in strong contrast to the approach of the Catholic Jesuits in Canada. They worked to add Christianity to the Natives' existing beliefs, as opposed to replacing them. They learned Native American languages and found ways to relate Christian principles to their existing religions (as was also done by Catholic missionaries in China). While some Natives were quick to take on the conversion, some did not like the idea of a full conversion. The process was not always an easy one, and there were many reasons for some to undertake conversion.

Refuge from war 

Some Natives converted because they believed it might increase their legitimacy in the eyes of the colonists and thus recognition of their rights to their land. Because of intertribal and intratribal strife and conflict with colonists, some of the Native Americans considered the praying towns as refuges from warfare. Other tribes had been all but destroyed from disease and famine, and possibly looked to Christianity and the Puritan way of life as an answer to their suffering, when their traditional beliefs did not seem to have helped them. Other Natives joined the towns because they had no other option economically or politically.

After King Philip's War in 1677, the General Court disbanded 10 of the original 14 towns. They placed the rest under the supervision of colonists. Many communities did survive and retained their own religious and education systems.

Failed assimilation 

While praying towns had some successes, they never reached the level which John Eliot had hoped for. The Puritans were pleased with the conversions, but Praying Indians were still considered second-rate citizens and never gained the degree of trust or respect from colonists which they had hoped conversion would grant them. It has also been argued that the Natives had a difficult time adjusting to the impersonal society of colonial America, since theirs had been built upon relationships and reciprocity, while that of the colonists were more structured and institutionalized. According to this view, this difference made it hard for Natives to see the institutionalized structures as a whole, and John Eliot had failed to see the need for adaptations appropriate for smoother transitions.

Self-governing 

Other historians  have noted that the Praying Indian communities exercised self-government by electing their own rulers and officials. This system  exhibited a degree of continuity with their precontact social system. While English-style offices, such as constables and Justices of the Peace were introduced, they were often designated with names identical to those of traditional Native American offices. The elected officials were often chosen from the ranks of the established tribal leadership. In some cases, Native hereditary rulers retained power. The communities also used their own languages as the language of administration, producing an abundance of legal and administrative documents that survive to this day. However, their self-government was gradually curtailed in the course of the 18th and 19th centuries, and their languages eventually became extinct. Most of the original "Praying Towns" declined due to epidemics and to the loss of communal land property during the centuries after their foundation.

See also

Indian Reductions
Mission Indians
Praying Indian
Stockbridge Indians

References

External links

 Praying Towns
 Praying Indians
 Interactive Map showing the Praying Towns in the 1600s

Assimilation of indigenous peoples of North America
Christian terminology
History of New England
King Philip's War
Martha's Vineyard
Native American history of Connecticut
Native American history of Massachusetts
Native American Christianity
Wampanoag